The 1954 United States Senate election in Delaware took place on November 2, 1954. Incumbent Democratic Senator J. Allen Frear Jr. won re-election to a second term.

Nominations
Nominations were made by party conventions.

Democratic nomination
The Democratic convention was held on August 10, 1954 at Dover.

Candidates
James M. Tunnell Jr., former justice of the Delaware Supreme Court
J. Allen Frear Jr., incumbent U.S. Senator

Results

Republican primary
The Republican convention was held on August 18, 1954 at the Capitol Theater, Dover.

Candidates
Herbert Warburton, incumbent U.S. Representative, unanimously

Not placed in nomination
Mrs. Vera G. Davis, former majority leader in the Delaware House of Representatives

General election

Results

See also 
 1954 United States Senate elections

References 

1954
Delaware
United States Senate